Brock Elliot Marion (born June 11, 1970) is a former American football free safety who played twelve seasons in the National Football League (NFL).  After playing college football for the University of Nevada, Reno, he was chosen in the seventh round of the 1993 NFL Draft by the Dallas Cowboys.  He also played for the Miami Dolphins and the Detroit Lions, and was a three-time Pro Bowler with the Dolphins. He is the son of NFL player Jerry Marion.

Early years
Marion played high school football at West High School, where as a senior he received All-State honor after leading the state with 13 interceptions. He also lettered in basketball and track.

He accepted a scholarship to attend the University of Nevada. He became a four-year starter, leading the secondary in tackles each year. He played cornerback during his first three years, before moving to strong safety as a senior. He finished his career with 303 tackles, 13 interceptions and deflected an additional 44 passes.

After his sophomore season, the University of Nevada earned three consecutive conference titles. In those years he was named All-Big Sky and All-Big West.

In 2006, he was inducted into the Nevada Athletics Hall of Fame.

Professional career

Dallas Cowboys
Marion was selected by the Dallas Cowboys in the seventh round of the 1993 NFL Draft. As a rookie, he was used as a backup safety and on special teams, where he was third on the team with 19 tackles. The next year, he tied for second on the team with 23 special teams tackles.

He became a starter at free safety in 1995, replacing James Washington who signed with the Washington Redskins as a free agent. He recorded 114 tackles (second on the team), 6 interceptions (tied for the second on the team) and helped the Cowboys win Super Bowl XXX.

In 1996, he missed 6 games and the playoffs because of a season-ending left scapula injury, finishing with 77 tackles (fifth on the team). He agreed to a four-year contract with the Baltimore Ravens on March 18, 1997. After a CT scan revealed that his left scapula injury had not fully healed and the failure to agree on a restructured contract, the Ravens backed out of the deal two days later on March 20 at a press conference originally intended to announce his signing. Marion ended up re-signing with the Cowboys for one year on April 7. He went on to have 100 tackles, including 19 (third most in franchise history) against the Green Bay Packers.

Miami Dolphins
Marion signed as a free agent with the Dolphins in 1998, reuniting with former head coach Jimmy Johnson. That season, he made 112 tackles (second on the team) with no interceptions. In 1999, he recorded 100 tackles (third on the team) and was used as the main kick returner, getting 62 returns for a league leading 1,524 yards (first in franchise history), including a return of 93 yards. The next year, he had 5 interceptions (tied for second on the team) and led the team with 109 tackles.

In 2001, he registered 5 interceptions (led the team) and finished third on the team with 97 tackles. he also was named as a first-alternate safety for the Pro Bowl. The next year, he finished with 109 tackles (second on the team) and 5 interceptions (second on the team).

In 2003, he was fourth on the team with 100 tackles and was released after the season in a salary cap move. With the Dolphins, he was a three-time Pro Bowl selection (2000, 2002 and 2003). He left ranking third on the franchise career list in kickoff returns (107), kickoff return yards (2,517) and kickoff return average (23.5).

Detroit Lions
Marion signed with the Detroit Lions in 2004, making 66 tackles, 3 interceptions, and starting 16 games. He was cut in a salary cap move on April 25, 2005 and was replaced with Terrence Holt as the new starter at free safety.

He retired with 676 career tackles, two quarterback sacks, 31 interceptions for 537 yards and three touchdowns. He also returned 123 kickoffs for 2,951 yards. He is the oldest player with an interception return of 100+ yards (31 years, 209 days).

Personal life
In 2004, Marion was arrested in south Florida for insurance fraud. He accepted fraudulent checks in the amounts of $54,247.94 from State Farm Insurance.

In 2008, Marion moved to Portland, Oregon where he opened two franchise locations of the National Personal Trainer Institute.

In 2013, Marion became the head coach for the football team at St. John Lutheran High School. His father Jerry Marion played wide receiver for one year with the Pittsburgh Steelers

References

External links
Ranking Best Cowboys Safeties In Franchise History
Miami Dolphins All-Time Top 100 Players
Marion taking over as St. John head football coach

1970 births
Living people
Players of American football from Bakersfield, California
American Conference Pro Bowl players
American football safeties
Nevada Wolf Pack football players
Dallas Cowboys players
Miami Dolphins players
Detroit Lions players